Barchatra Ramkanai Institution is a Secondary School in Bankura District, West Bengal.  It has over 1500 students. It is affiliated to the West Bengal Board of Secondary Education.

References

High schools and secondary schools in West Bengal
Schools in Bankura district
Educational institutions in India with year of establishment missing